Fishing Australia is an Australian fishing television program, produced by WIN Television. The program premiered in 2001 and is broadcast on weekends on WIN Television and Network Ten formerly on the Nine Network, Imparja and NBN Television.

Fishing Australia travels around Australia, fishing for different species of fish in unique locations.  The show also features special guests ranging from iconic Australians, television and media personalities through to local fishing guides and identities. It is hosted by professional fishing guide, writer, photographer and television presenter, Rob Paxevanos.

See also

 WIN Television

References

External links
 Official Website

WIN Television original programming
Nine Network original programming
Network 10 original programming
Australian sports television series
Fishing television series
2001 Australian television series debuts
Television shows set in Australia
2010s Australian television series
Recreational fishing in Australia
English-language television shows